Stanwix Peak is a distinctive peak (2,240 m) which surmounts the south side of the head of Astapenko Glacier in the Bowers Mountains. The peak was used as a reference object by surveyor S. Kirkby, with the ANARE (Australian National Antarctic Research Expeditions) (Thala Dan), 1962. Named by ANARE for Captain John Stanwix, helicopter pilot with the expedition.

Mountains of Victoria Land
Pennell Coast